Manmohan means 'Winner of the heart'. It is another name of Krishna, the Hindu deity, one of the "avatars" (or "incarnation") of Lord Vishnu. Manmohan may also refer to:

Man Mohan Adhikari (1920–1999), former Prime Minister of Nepal
Manmohan (actor) (1933–1979), Indian actor
Manmohan Acharya (1967–2013), poet and lyricist from India
Manmohan Desai (1937–1994), producer and director of Indian movies
Manmohan Ghose (1869–1924), poet, one of the first from India to write poetry in English
Manmohan Krishna (1922–1990), actor in Hindi cinema, credited as Manmohan
Manmohan Mahapatra (1951–2020), Oriya filmmaker, director, producer and writer
Manmohan Malhoutra, Indian former diplomat and Assistant Secretary-General of the Commonwealth of Nations
Manmohan Shetty, known as the 'man with a midas touch' in Indian film industry
Manmohan Singh (born 1932), the 13th Prime Minister of India
Manmohan Singh (director), director of Punjabi films
Manmohan Waris (born 1967), award-winning Indian Punjabi folk/pop singer
Manmohan (film)

See also
Communist Party of Nepal (Manmohan)
Dr Manmohan Singh Scholarship

Indian masculine given names